Różewicz is a Polish surname. Notable people with the surname include:

 Stanisław Różewicz (1924–2008), Polish film director and screenwriter
 Tadeusz Różewicz (1921–2014), Polish poet and writer

Polish-language surnames